The Division of Makin is an electoral division for the Australian House of Representatives located in the northeastern suburbs of Adelaide. The 130 km² seat covers an area from Little Para River and Gould Creek in the north-east to Grand Junction Road in the south and Port Wakefield Road in the west, including the suburbs of Banksia Park, Fairview Park, Golden Grove, Greenwith, Gulfview Heights, Ingle Farm, Mawson Lakes, Modbury, Para Hills, Para Vista, Pooraka, Redwood Park, Ridgehaven, Salisbury East, Salisbury Heights, St Agnes, Surrey Downs, Tea Tree Gully, Valley View, Vista, Walkley Heights, Wynn Vale, Yatala Vale, and parts of Gepps Cross and Hope Valley.

Geography
Since 1984, federal electoral division boundaries in Australia have been determined at redistributions by a redistribution committee appointed by the Australian Electoral Commission. Redistributions occur for the boundaries of divisions in a particular state, and they occur every seven years, or sooner if a state's representation entitlement changes or when divisions of a state are malapportioned.

History

Established in the South Australian redistribution of 3 September 1984 and named after MP and diplomat Norman Makin, it was a marginal mortgage belt seat with a higher proportion of the population in the area paying off home loans. In the 2006 census, over 42 percent of the seat's electors had a home mortgage; ranking it 19th highest in Australia's 150 seats.

Created ahead of the 1984 election as a notionally fairly safe Labor seat, Labor won marginally. For the first quarter-century of its existence, the seat was a "bellwether" seat held by the party of government, both often typical of mortgage belt seats. During this time, it was usually marginal, with neither party winning more than 54 percent of the two-party vote.

Later years
Labor's Tony Zappia won the seat at the 2007 election with a fairly safe 57.7 percent two-party vote against Liberal candidate Bob Day from an 8.6 percent two-party swing as Labor won government, the largest two-party vote and swing of any party in Makin's history at the time. Zappia won enough primary votes to take the seat on the first count, the first time a candidate won a majority of the primary vote in Makin. At the 2010 election, Zappia technically made it a safe Labor seat with a 62.2 percent two-party vote, again the strongest result for any party in Makin's history. Even though Mawson Lakes was added to Makin in a redistribution, Zappia held the seat at the 2013 election with a reduced marginal 55.1 percent two-party vote even as Labor lost government, becoming the first opposition member in Makin's history. He consolidated his hold on the seat at the 2016 election with a 59.5 percent two-party vote.

Bellwether seat
ABC psephologist Antony Green listed Makin as one of eleven which he classed as "bellwether" electorates in his 2016 election guide. Notably, Makin was the only bellwether located outside of New South Wales and Queensland.

Members

Election results

See also
 2016 Australian federal election
 Results of the Australian federal election, 2016 (South Australia)

References
 ABC profile for Makin: 2016
 Poll Bludger profile for Makin: 2016
 AEC profile for Makin: 2016

Notes

External links
 SA boundary map, 2001: AEC
 SA boundary map, 1984: Atlas SA

Electoral divisions of Australia
Constituencies established in 1984
1984 establishments in Australia